Deep River: The Island is a Canadian zombie comedy film released in 2009. The motion picture was written by George Stuckert and directed by Ben Bachelder. The movie was produced by Ben Bachelder, Clayton Moore, Susan Stuckert-Bachelder, and George Stuckert. The music score was written by Cassidy Bisher, Casino, Richard DeHove, Drop Drop, and Lee Fitzsimmons. It stars Kristopher Bowman, Maia Kaufhold and Jo-Ellen Size. The movie was filmed in Deep River, Ontario, Canada.

The movie was filmed between July 28, 2008 - October 2, 2008. It was released July 28, 2010 at the Action On Film International Film Festival and October 2010 at the Eerie Horror Film Festival.

Summary
Six friends from a small rural Canadian high school, reunite for the summer and must fight for survival against the undead.

Cast

Additional Zombies

See also
 List of zombie films

References

External links
 

Zombie comedy films
2009 horror films
2009 comedy horror films
Canadian comedy horror films
2009 films
English-language Canadian films
Canadian comedy-drama films
Canadian zombie films
2009 comedy films
2000s English-language films
2000s Canadian films